John G. Cook (born April 19, 1956) is an American volleyball head coach of the Nebraska Cornhuskers volleyball team, who is in his 23rd season as head coach in 2022. He has led the Huskers to four national championships, in 2000 by defeating Wisconsin, in 2006 by defeating Stanford, in 2015 by defeating Texas, and in 2017 by defeating Florida. He is a two-time winner of the AVCA National Coach of the Year award. Prior to becoming head coach at Nebraska, Cook served as head coach of the Wisconsin Badgers, compiling a 161–73 record over seven seasons. On September 23, 2022 he earned his 800th career coaching win, a feat only 29 other coaches in NCAA volleyball history have achieved.

Early life
Cook graduated from the University of San Diego, earning his bachelor's degree in history in 1979. He completed his master's degree in teaching and coaching effectiveness from San Diego State in 1991.

Coaching career

UC San Diego
Cook served as the head assistant coach at the University of California, San Diego from 1983 to 1984, where he aided the Tritons to a second-place national finish in 1983 and an NCAA Division III national championship the next year. Cook’s coaching credentials include leading Francis Parker High School in San Diego to two California state championships. During his six-year coaching stint from 1981 to 1988, he had a .900 winning percentage with an overall record of 162–18, including a 90-match winning streak.

Wisconsin
John Cook was hired in 1992 to coach Wisconsin. In seven years as head coach he had a record of 161–73 before resigning to accept the Nebraska position. He was named the Big Ten Co-Coach and AVCA District 2 Coach of the Year after leading the Badgers to a share of the 1997 Big 10 title with a 19–1 mark and school-record 30–3 overall record. The Badgers advanced to a postseason tournament in Cook's final six years at the school, including NCAA appearances in 1993, 1994, 1996, 1997 and 1998. In 1995, Wisconsin won the National Invitational Volleyball Championship with a perfect 6–0 record. During his tenure at UW, he coached four All-Americans, nine AVCA All-District award winners, 11 All-Big Ten honorees, two Big Ten Freshmen of the Year, and 21 Academic All-Big 10 selections.

Nebraska
Cook succeeded Terry Pettit in 2000 as the coach at Nebraska. Cook has guided the Huskers to four national championships (2000, 2006, 2015, 2017), three national runner-up finishes (2005, 2018, 2021), and three other national semifinal appearances (2001, 2008, 2016). Cook has made the NCAA tournament in each of his years at Nebraska (the Cornhuskers have appeared in every NCAA tournament since its inception in 1982). Cook was named the AVCA Division I National Coach of the Year in 2000 and 2005, the AVCA Central Region Coach of the Year in 1997 (Wisconsin), 2000, 2005, and 2008 as well as the Big 12 Conference Coach of the Year in 2001, 2005, and 2008. He was also awarded the USA Volleyball All-Time Great Coach Award in 2008.

At Nebraska, Cook has coached three AVCA National Players of the Year (Greichaly Cepero in 2000, Christina Houghtelling in 2005 and Sarah Pavan in 2006). Pavan also won the Honda-Broderick Cup in 2007 as the Collegiate Female Athlete of the Year.

Personal life
Cook and his wife Wendy, a former two-time All-America setter at San Diego State, are the parents of two children, Lauren and Taylor. Lauren was the starting setter for UCLA during the 2009 season and garnered National Freshman of the Year honors.  She transferred to Nebraska in 2010 and finished her career there in 2012 as an All-American.

Head coaching record

Awards and honors

Single-season awards
AVCA Division I Central Region Coach of the Year: 1997, 2000, 2005, 2008, 2016
AVCA Coach of the Year: 2000, 2005
Big Ten Coach of the Year: 1997 (co), 2016, 2017
Big 12 Coach of the Year: 2001, 2005, 2008, 2010
Volleyball Magazine Coach of the Year: 2008

Career awards
AVCA Hall of Fame (2017)
USA Volleyball All-Time Great Coach (2008)

Career achievements
4 national championships (2000, 2006, 2015, 2017)
7 national finals (2000, 2005, 2006, 2015, 2017, 2018, 2021)
10 national semifinals (2000, 2001, 2005, 2006, 2008, 2015, 2016, 2017, 2018, 2021)
13 conference championships
18 top-10 finishes
52 All-Americans coached at Nebraska

References

External links
 Nebraska profile

1956 births
Living people
American volleyball coaches
Nebraska Cornhuskers women's volleyball coaches
UC San Diego Tritons coaches
Wisconsin Badgers women's volleyball coaches
High school volleyball coaches in the United States
University of San Diego alumni
Sportspeople from Chula Vista, California